A fetish club is a nightclub, bar, social club or other entertainment hub which caters to clientele interested in some of (but not necessarily all) fetish fashion, bondage, dominance/submission, and/or sadism and masochism (BDSM). Some clubs have active "play" going on inside the club while others are a socialising place for like-minded people.
Fetish Community events take place at specialty fare hosted at other public venues and night clubs.

Activities at fetish clubs have been interpreted as "neo-burlesque, freak show, queer and body mutation styles".  The fetish club as carnival represents a rejection of "official" world views.

See also
 List of universities with BDSM clubs
 Play party (BDSM)
 Munch (BDSM)
 Sex club

References

Fetish subculture
BDSM terminology